The Philippines was represented at the FIBA 3x3 World Tour Finals two times, debuting in 2014. So far the teams that represented the country are based in Metro Manila; Manila West and Manila North.

Two Masters tournaments (in 2014 and 2015) were hosted in the Philippines, both of which were hosted within Metro Manila.

The country will host two Masters tournament in 2022; one in Metro Manila and another in Cebu.

FIBA 3x3 World Tour

Finals rosters

Finals record

FIBA 3x3 All-Stars

Rosters

See also
Philippines men's national 3x3 team

References

Countries at the FIBA 3x3 World Tour
3x3 basketball in the Philippines